The 2017 ConIFA European Football Cup was the second edition of the ConIFA European Football Cup, an international football tournament for states, minorities, stateless peoples and regions unaffiliated with FIFA organised by ConIFA. It was hosted in Northern Cyprus.

Tournament
Following the 2015 ConIFA European Football Cup, the next tournament was announced to take place between 4–11 June 2017 in Northern Cyprus at the organization's Annual General Meeting in February 2017. A total of eight teams were announced as taking part in the tournament, planned to be held across four locations.

Hosts

Participants
A total of eight teams were announced as participating – both the current European Football Cup holders Padania and reigning World Football Cup champions Abkhazia were automatically qualified, with the remainder voted on by ConIFA members.

Withdrawals
Subsequent to the announcement of the eight participants, three then withdrew:
Sapmi withdrew and were replaced by South Ossetia.
County of Nice withdrew and were replaced by Felvidék.
Occitania withdrew and were replaced by Kárpátalja.

Squad

Matches

Group stage
The results of the group stage draw:

Group A

Group B

Knockout stage

Bracket

Placement round

Semi-finals

Third-place play-off

Final

Final positions

Top scorers
5 goals
 Barna Bajkó

3 goals

 Ertaç Taşkıran
 Halil Turan
 Andrea Rota

2 goals

 Dmitri Kortava
 Anatoli Semyonov
 Ciaran McNultey
 Attila Molnár
 Tibor Kész
 László Szőcs
 İbrahim Çıdamlı
 Mustafa Yaşınses

1 goal

 Ruslan Shoniya
 Chriss Bass, Jr
 Liam Cowin
 Chris Cannell
 Sean Doyle
 Richard Križan
 Ferenc Barta
 Krisztián Mile
 Roland Szabó
 Ohar Roman
 Zoltán Baksa
 Norbert Fodor
 Uğur Gök
 Serhan Önet
 Ersid Plumbaj
 William Rosset
 Alan Kadjaev
 Solsan Kochiev
 Attila Csürös
 Petru Silion

Own goals
 Marc Kelly (in match Kárpátalja – Ellan Vannin)

References

CONIFA European Football Cup
2017 in Northern Cyprus
2017 in association football
Football competitions in Northern Cyprus
June 2017 sports events in Europe